Klaineanthus is a genus of plants, under the family Euphorbiaceae. There is only one known species, Klaineanthus gaboniae, native to central Africa (Nigeria, Cameroon, Gabon, Zaire, São Tomé and Príncipe).

References

Adenoclineae
Monotypic Euphorbiaceae genera
Flora of Africa